{{DISPLAYTITLE:C8H5NO2}}
The molecular formula C8H5NO2 (molar mass: 147.13 g/mol, exact mass: 147.032028 u) may refer to:

 Indole-5,6-quinone, a chemical present in the browning reaction of fruits
 Isatin
 Phthalimide

Molecular formulas